The ancient Cappadocian language was an ancient language or group of languages spoken in Asia Minor, possibly related to Hittite or Luwian. If Luwian, it may have been related to the dialect of Tabal.  However, there are no known texts in this language.

Strabo and Basil of Caesarea state that it was not Greek.

It was ultimately replaced by Koine Greek, but appears to have survived in some locations until at least the 6th century CE.

Notes

Languages of ancient Anatolia
Languages extinct in the 6th century
Unclassified languages of Asia
Unclassified Indo-European languages
Unattested languages of Asia